A flood embankment is traditionally an earth wall used to shore up flood waters.

Most flood embankments are between 1 metre and 3 metres high. A  flood embankment is rare.

Modern improvements to this design include constructing an internal central core made from impermeable substance like clay or concrete, some even use metal pilings.

Some authorities call man-made structures levees.

Problems

Examples 

Clifton, Rawcliffe, Poppleton and Leeman ings in York

River Gowan, Cumbria

River Trent

Animation 

This is an animation showing a flood event overwhelming neighbouring properties and the added construction of a flood embankment and flood warning and protection status.

References 

Flood control